Jessie Floyd Tuggle, III (born April 4, 1965) is a former professional American football linebacker who played for the Atlanta Falcons his entire career from 1987 to 2000. He graduated from Valdosta State College in Valdosta, Georgia. He appeared in the Pro Bowl five times, and  played in Super Bowl XXXIII. His nickname is "the Hammer", because of the impact of his tackles.

Early years 
Tuggle played at Griffin High School, where he experienced success playing football. He received two Division II scholarship offers.

Taking a scholarship at Valdosta State University, Tuggle played four years and finished with a school-record 340 tackles. He was a three-time All-Gulf South Conference selection and his No. 88 was retired less than a decade after Tuggle left.

In 2007, he was inducted into the College Football Hall of Fame.

Professional career
After going undrafted out of Valdosta State, Tuggle signed with the Falcons through a chance encounter. During training camp, myriad injuries at linebacker gave Tuggle playing time and a shot at making the roster (which he did).

After being a role player his rookie season, he recorded 108 tackles by virtue of eight starts. Becoming a bona fide star on the Atlanta defense, marked by the 1989-1993 period in which Tuggle racked up 969 tackles. During that stretch, he made his first Pro Bowl appearance in 1992. Even while the Falcons languished, Tuggle never thought of leaving in free agency, even when he would meet former teammates like Brett Favre. This endeared him to many Atlanta fans, who consider him one of the greatest and most beloved Falcons of all time.

After being with the Falcons through some tough years, the high point in Tuggle's career was 1998, when he played in Super Bowl XXXIII and was voted to the Pro Bowl.

Tuggle retired during training camp in 2001 after injuries plagued the end of his career.

In his 14 seasons, he recorded 1640 tackles (164 assisted), 21 sacks, 6 interceptions, which he returned for 106 yards and a touchdown, 10 forced fumbles and 37 pass deflections.  He also recovered 10 fumbles, returning them for 155 yards and an NFL record 5 touchdowns.

Tuggle also holds the record for most tackles from 1990 to 1999 with 1,293. At the time of his retirement, he held the NFL record for touchdowns via fumble recoveries with five.

Personal life
His son, Justin Tuggle, played at Kansas State University and currently plays defensive end for the Toronto Argonauts in the Canadian Football League. His other son, Grady Jarrett, played college football at Clemson University and was selected in the 5th round of the 2015 NFL Draft by his father's former team, the Atlanta Falcons. Tuggle has experienced some concussion-related symptoms like memory loss.

References

External links
Pro Football Reference Profile

1965 births
Living people
People from Griffin, Georgia
Players of American football from Georgia (U.S. state)
American football middle linebackers
Valdosta State Blazers football players
College Football Hall of Fame inductees
Atlanta Falcons players
National Conference Pro Bowl players
Ed Block Courage Award recipients